Schizobranchia is a genus of marine feather duster worm. It is closely related to Pseudopotamilla and Eudistylia, and is distinguished by its dichotomously branched radioles.

References 

Sabellida
Polychaete genera